The Aspromonte is a mountain massif in the Metropolitan City of Reggio Calabria (Calabria, southern Italy). The literal translation of the name means "rough mountain". But for others the name more likely is related to the Greek word Aspros (Άσπρος), meaning "white". It overlooks the Strait of Messina, being limited by the Ionian and Tyrrhenian Seas and by the Pietrace river. The highest peak is Montalto. The constituting rocks are mostly gneiss, and mica schists, which form characteristic overlapping terraces. The massif is part of the Aspromonte National Park.

In the short coastal strip citrus fruits, vine and olives are grown, while at high elevations the vegetation is composed mostly by oak and holm oak under , and by pine, Sicilian fir and beech over it. Olive trees grow in abundance. Also, the rare bergamot, the lemony-yellow fruit used in perfumes and flavoring for Earl Grey tea, only grows in the southern Aspromonte.

Points of interest include the Gambarie ski resort and the Sanctuary of Our Lady of Polsi, in the comune of San Luca. Part of the population known as the Griko people have retained Greek culture and language (the so-called Griko language).

Giuseppe Garibaldi, landing here with 3,000 volunteers in his march towards Rome, was defeated and captured on August 29, 1862, in the Battle of Aspromonte.

In 2021, Aspromonte was designated as a Global Geopark by UNESCO, the United Nations Educational, Scientific and Cultural Organization. In the same year, several people died as a result of various wild fires...

See also
 Griko people
 Magna Graecia

References

Mountains of Calabria
Mountains of the Apennines